New York Mills is a village in Oneida County, New York, United States. The population was 3,327  at the 2010 census.

The Village of New York Mills is partly in the Town of Whitestown and partly in the Town of New Hartford. It is a western suburb of the City of Utica.

History
There were three mills which gave the village its name.  They dated from around 1808 and closed in the 1950s. The Middle Mill Historic District was listed on the National Register of Historic Places in 1976.

New York Mills (Images of America) by James S. Pula and Eugene E. Dziedzic provide a detailed history on the village in their book:
New York Mills, named for the textile factories that were once the backbone of the surrounding villages economy, ranked among the foremost producers of quality fabrics in the country. Originally a wilderness area just south of the Mohawk River, the community began with a few scattered homes after the establishment of a small textile mill in 1808. Nourished by a growing economy, the village attracted a mosaic of Welsh and French-Canadian workers in the 19th century, followed by Poles, Syro-Lebanese, and Italians in the early 20th century. A hotbed of abolitionism in the antebellum years, it sent high percentages of its residents off to the Civil War, World War I, and World War II. In 1912 and 1916, its Polish residents founded a union and led textile strikes that were considered the most successful in the nation at that time. With the eventual closing of the mills in the 1950s, residents found employment in the surrounding area as the village evolved into a stable and prosperous suburban community.

After the Revolutionary War, which started in the year of 1775 and ended in 1783, an act was passed and the town of Whitestown was formed.   There was a piece of land west of Sadaquada Creek newly given the name New York Mills.  People started to settle down on this small piece of land and create a life there in 1902.  The people of the village built a school house, organized a school district for other settlers and their children.  In 1902 Walcott &. Co was formed.

In 1810 mill number 2 of 4 was formed "Oneida Manufacturing Society."  In 1813 mill number 3 "Whitestown Cotton and Woolen Manufacturing Society" was formed and began operating in 1827.  1870 the Burr Stone mill was created and lastly mill number 4 of 4 was built and operating in 1902. New York Mills was full of booming industries before it became a village.  The village is close to major rivers, the Mohawk river being one, and "many lakes and the spectacular Adirondack Mountains where residents can be dazzled by the fresh water lakes, valleys or mountains within a short time."

The village has always been fairly small considering it is located in between, and in close proximity to, the two larger villages of New Hartford and Whitesboro [New York Mills also adjoins the village of Yorkville, both being western suburbs of the City of Utica].  The village incorporated a blacksmith, bakery, drug stores, and a few hotels.  The name New York Mills originated from the mills that were located in the small village.  In 1870 the Burr Stone Mill was built.  It is massive in size and stands four and a half stories high, "the mill is 250 feet long and 70 feet wide".  Weaving machinery was dedicated to the first floor of the building.  "The remaining floors two, three, and four were for spooling, carding, and warping"

In 1902, Benjamin Stuart Walcott,Sr. and his son, Benjamin Stuart Walcott, Jr. opened the Walcott & Campbell Spinning Mill on Sauquoit Street. The Walcotts established the mill near Sadaquada Creek because they saw the potential of water power from the creek. After the mill shut down near mid-century, the building was split into two units, with the south side of the building occupied by the  Nehi Bottling Works, and the north side occupied by Husted Concrete Products, a company that manufactured concrete pipe.  As early as 1878, a high percentage of immigrants became an integral part of the villages population".  At this time Polish Immigrants began to settle in New York Mills to look for jobs and a place to live. Since the inception of the village,  many improvements have been made such as road paving and updating old buildings that were built 75 years ago.  However, "from its meager beginnings New York Mills has evolved and shaped up in throughout the past centuries"

Notable people
 Lewis A. Brigham, represented New Jersey's 7th congressional district in the United States House of Representatives from 1879 to 1881
 Robin Curtis, actress
 Ed Furgol, winner of 1954 U.S. Open at Baltusrol, champion golfer who overcame an unbending left arm from a broken elbow at age 12
 Marty Furgol, PGA golfer (unrelated to Ed Furgol)
 Charles Doolittle Walcott, paleontologist
 Frederic C. Walcott, United States Senator representing Connecticut from 1929 to 1935

Geography

The village is south of the Mohawk River. Some of the surrounding towns and cities near New York Mills include Whitesboro, Utica, Yorkville, and New Hartford.

Demographics

As of the census of 2000, there were 3,191 people, 1,550 households, and 806 families residing in the village. The population density was 2,807.6 people per square mile (1,080.7/km2). There were 1,633 housing units at an average density of 1,436.8 per square mile (553.1/km2). The racial makeup of the village was 98.21% White, 0.38% African American, 0.06% Native American, 0.34% Asian, 0.03% Pacific Islander, 0.25% from other races, and 0.72% from two or more races. Hispanic or Latino of any race were 1.07% of the population.

There were 1,550 households, out of which 21.9% had children under the age of 18 living with them, 37.9% were married couples living together, 10.5% had a female householder with no husband present, and 48.0% were non-families. 41.7% of all households were made up of individuals, and 21.4% had someone living alone who was 65 years of age or older. The average household size was 2.06 and the average family size was 2.84.

In the village, the population was spread out, with 18.6% under the age of 18, 7.9% from 18 to 24, 28.1% from 25 to 44, 21.3% from 45 to 64, and 24.0% who were 65 years of age or older. The median age was 42 years. For every 100 females, there were 81.7 males. For every 100 females age 18 and over, there were 78.3 males.

The median income for a household in the village was $30,993, and the median income for a family was $39,779. Males had a median income of $30,000 versus $29,844 for females. The per capita income for the village was $19,793. About 8.6% of families and 10.7% of the population were below the poverty line, including 17.9% of those under age 18 and 6.7% of those age 65 or over.

References

External links

New York Mills Union Free School website

1922 establishments in New York (state)
Populated places established in 1808
Utica–Rome metropolitan area
Villages in Oneida County, New York
Villages in New York (state)